The 2013 Ohio Machine season is the second season for the Ohio Machine of Major League Lacrosse. The Machine will try to improve upon their inaugural season in 2011, where they finished a league-worst 2-12.

Standings

External links
 Team Website

Ohio Machine
Ohio Machine
Machine
Lacrosse in Ohio